Henry Iles Woodcock was  Chief Justice of Tobago from 1862 until 1867.
 
Iles wrote a history of Tobago, published in 1867.

References

Chief Justices of Tobago